Gaspare Traversi (c. 1722 – 1 November 1770) was an Italian Rococo painter best known for his genre works. Active mostly in his native city of Naples, he also painted throughout Italy, including a stay in Parma.

Gaspare appears to have been born to a Genoese merchant living in Naples. He appears to have been baptized on February 15, 1722, in the church of Santa Maria dell'Incoronatella in Naples under the name Gasparro Giovanni Battista Pascale Traversa. He trained under Francesco Solimena. He was a contemporary of other Solimena pupils, Giuseppe Bonito (1707–1789), also a genre painter, and Francesco de Mura (1696–1784). He was active mainly between 1732 and 1769.

Traversi can be described as a Neapolitan Hogarth, Steen or Longhi, working in a Caravaggist style. Traversi's satirical paintings typically depict animated groups of bourgeois protagonists that seem compressed physically into an indoor pictorial space that can barely contain them. Even his religious canvases have foreshortened crowding. Facial expressions are lively and varied; some of the characters, often children, stare at the viewer. Women are often situated in either a foolish or ironic situation, or engage in a pulchritudinous talent, while men leer or participate with other intentions in mind. One could view these as elaborations of moralistic tales, such as Caravaggio's The Fortune Teller, a topic which Traversi also depicted, but Traversi's living rooms are more densely populated, and the emotions, as well as the situations, teeter awkwardly with imbalance.

Although he had no pupils, his influence was significant, and can be seen in the works of Lorenzo de Caro, Giuseppe Bonito and  Orazio Solimena.

Traversi was a focus of a monograph by Roberto Longhi.

Gallery

Partial anthology of works

Notes

References

Naples Exhibition in 2005 was titled Gaspare Traversi. Napolitans of the 1700s between Misery and Nobility 
Stuttgart Exhibition: Gaspare Traversi Amusement in the Shade 
Parma Exhibition:Luminary of the 1700s: Gaspare Traversi and his painting in Emilia,.

External links

1722 births
1770 deaths
18th-century Italian painters
Italian male painters
Italian genre painters
Painters from Naples
Rococo painters
18th-century Italian male artists